Conesus Lake  is a lake located in Livingston County, New York. Conesus Lake is the westernmost of New York's eleven Finger Lakes.

Description

It flows south to north, from its inlet in the Town of Conesus to its outlet, Conesus Creek, in Lakeville, a hamlet in the Town of Livonia in Livingston County. Conesus Creek in turn flows into the Genesee River near Avon.

The first steamboat on Conesus Lake was named the "Jessie" launched July 1, 1874, after the Civil War.

In August 2006, the New York State Department of Environmental Conservation confirmed that the lake was the first outside the contiguous Great Lakes waterways to be stricken with a new strain of viral hemorrhagic septicemia (VHS), an infectious fish disease responsible for mass die-offs of many species, but not linked to any human health concerns. The disease is spread between waterways through live or frozen bait fish, roe, contaminated fishing equipment or live water wells in boats.

Recreation

On July 3 of each year, the residents of the lake participate in a tradition called the "Ring of Fire", sponsored by the Conesus Lake Association. Participants light road flares around the lake and shoot off fireworks. The festivities typically start at dusk, with approximately 10,000 flares lit at 10:00 PM.

When frozen over in the winter, Conesus Lake is used for snowmobiling and ice fishing.

Fishing

Fish species present in the lake include walleye, northern pike, yellow perch, smallmouth bass, largemouth bass, and tiger muskie. To access there is state owned hard surface ramp off East Lake Road, a state owned hand launch access on Pebble Beach Road in the hamlet of Lakeville, a state owned hand launch access on US-20A in the hamlet of Lakeville, or at a car top launch access on the south shore off NY-256.

References

External links

Conesus Lake Association

Conesus
Lakes of Livingston County, New York
Tourist attractions in Livingston County, New York
Lakes of New York (state)